The mayor of Yazoo City, Mississippi is elected every four years by the population at large. Being the chief executive officer of the city, the mayor is responsible for administering and leading the day-to-day operations of city government. The current mayor of the city is David "Mel" Starling, who was elected in 2022.

City Hall is located at 128 East Jefferson Street.

List of mayors

Nineteenth century

Twentieth Century

Twenty-first century

References

External links
Official website of Yazoo City, Mississippi

Yazoo City, Mississippi